Asparagus acutifolius, common name wild asparagus, is an evergreen perennial plant belonging to the genus Asparagus.

Description 
Asparagus acutifolius reaches on average  of height. The stems have much-branched feathery foliage. The "leaves" are in fact needle-like modified stems. The flowers are dioecious (on each plant they are only male or female). In some Mediterranean regions flowering occurs in late Summer from August through September, often after heavy storms.

Gallery

Distribution 
This species is present throughout the Mediterranean Basin.

Habitat 
These plants grow near woods and in uncultivated places, on dry and sunny soil.

References 

 Pignatti S. - Flora d'Italia – Edagricole – 1982 Vol. III. pg. 398

External links 
 Biolib

Acutifolius
Plants described in 1753
Taxa named by Carl Linnaeus
Dioecious plants